January 2013

See also

References

 01
January 2013 events in the United States